Onias I (Hebrew: חוניו ; Honiyya or Honio ben Jaddua) was the son of the Jaddua mentioned in Nehemiah. According to Josephus, this Jaddua is said to have been a contemporary of Alexander the Great (reigned 336-323 BCE). I Maccabees regards Onias as a contemporary of the Spartan king Areus I (309-265 BCE). "Josephus is ... mistaken in placing it in the time of Onias III instead of Onias I, who was high priest c. 300 B.C. (cf. Ant. xi. 347)."

Simon the Just extolled in the Wisdom of Sirach (according to the Hebrew text the son of Jonathan, but according to the Greek text the son of Onias) and in legend was probably the son of Onias I or, according to some, of the latter's grandson Onias II.

Patrilineal Ancestry

References

Resources
Gottheil, Richard and Samuel Krauss. "Onias." Jewish Encyclopedia. Funk and Wagnalls, 1901–1906, which cites to the following bibliography: 
H. P. Chajes, Beiträge zur Nordsemitischen Onomatologie, p. 23, Vienna, 1900 (on the name);
Herzfeld, Gesch. des Volkes Jisrael, i. 185-189, 201-206;
Heinrich Grätz, Gesch. 2d ed., ii. 236;
Emil Schürer, Gesch. 3d ed., i. 182, 194-196; iii. 97-100;
Niese, in Hermes, xxxv. 509;
Wellhausen, I. J. G. 4th ed., p. 248, Berlin, 1901;
Willrich, Juden und Griechen vor der Makkabäischen Erhebung, pp. 77, 109, Göttingen, 1895;
Adolf Büchler, Die Tobiaden und die Oniaden, pp. 166, 240, 275, 353, Vienna, 1899;
J. P. Mahaffy, The Empire of the Ptolemies, pp. 217, 353, London, 1895;
Gelzer, Sextus Julius Africanus, ii. 170-176, Leipsic, 1885;
Isaac Hirsch Weiss, Dor, i. 130 (on the halakic view of the temple of Onias).

4th-century BCE High Priests of Israel
3rd-century BCE High Priests of Israel
People in the deuterocanonical books